Bruno Guillon (born 25 June 1971) is a French radio and television presenter.  He is known for presenting Laurent Ruquier's sketch comedy show On n'demande qu'à en rire in 2014. He also co-hosted on MCM the special "La Nuit de la pub drole" and "La nuit de la pub sexy" with Val Kahl.
In February 2018, animator of France 2 :
Les Z'amours.

References

External links
 

1971 births
Living people
French television presenters
French radio presenters
People from Charente-Maritime